Glyoxal-bis(mesitylimine) is an organic compound with the formula H2C2(NC6H2Me3)2 (Me = methyl). It is a yellow solid that is soluble in organic solvents. It is classified as a diimine ligand. It is used in coordination chemistry and homogeneous catalysis. It is synthesized by condensation of 2,4,6-trimethylaniline and glyoxal.  In addition to its direct use as a ligand, it is a precursor to imidazole precursors to the popular NHC ligand called IMes.

Related compounds

Glyoxal-bis(triisopropylphenylimine), which is bulkier than glyoxal-bis(mesitylimine).

References

Chelating agents
Imines